Garrett Heath (born November 3, 1985) is an American runner from Winona, Minnesota, who raced in various middle and long-distance running events. He represented the United States at the 2010 World Indoor Championships where he finished seventh in the 1500 meters. He is the elder brother of Elliott Heath.

High school
Heath is from Winona, Minnesota where he won 6 state titles in track and field and cross-country and two state titles in cross-country skiing. He qualified for the Foot Locker Cross Country Championships in his junior and senior years of high school and finished sixth in 2002 and 10th in 2003.

Collegiate
Heath graduated high school and attended Stanford University, where he was a nine-time All-American (placing in the top 8 at the national championships in track and field or 35 in the single-event NCAA cross-country championships) including leadoff leg to the championship distance-medley relay team in the 2007 NCAA Indoor Track and Field Championships. He specialized in the 1500, mile and 5K and was one of the lead runners for the Stanford cross-country team. He broke the 4-minute mile barrier in 2007. He was one of only three collegians along with teammate Russell Brown and Leonel Manzano to run a mile in under four minutes that year. Heath was also the runner-up to Oklahoma State University's German Fernandez in the 2009 NCAA Outdoor Track and Field Championships.

Post-collegiate
As a professional, Heath runs for Brooks, training with the Brooks Beasts track club. In 2012, the Olympic year, he was ranked 4th among US distance runners in the mile and the 1500 indoors although he was ranked 8th among U.S. metric milers in outdoor track and finished ninth in his semifinal heat, thus failing to qualify for the 2012 Olympic Team. Heath defeated Leonel Manzano in 2013 to win the USA 1 Mile Road Championship. Heath won the 2014 Silicon Valley Turkey Trot in 13:54. In 2014, Heath was the surprise winner of the Great Edinburgh International Cross Country short course (4 km) race, then defended his title by winning again in 2015. A third victory came in 2016 and he gave world champion Mo Farah his first cross country defeat since 2010.

USA National Championships

References

External links 

 

1985 births
Living people
People from Winona, Minnesota
Sportspeople from Minnesota
American male middle-distance runners
Stanford Cardinal men's track and field athletes
Athletes (track and field) at the 2015 Pan American Games
Pan American Games track and field athletes for the United States
Stanford Cardinal men's cross country runners
21st-century American people